WFUT-DT (channel 68) is a television station licensed to Newark, New Jersey, United States, serving as the UniMás outlet for the New York City area. It is one of two flagship stations of the Spanish-language network (the other being WAMI-DT in Miami–Fort Lauderdale, Florida). WFUT-DT is owned and operated by TelevisaUnivision alongside Paterson, New Jersey–licensed Univision co-flagship WXTV-DT (channel 41) and Smithtown, New York–licensed True Crime Network affiliate WFTY-DT (channel 67). The stations share studios on Frank W. Burr Boulevard in Teaneck, New Jersey; WFUT-DT and WXTV-DT share transmitter facilities at the Empire State Building in Midtown Manhattan.	

WFUT's programming is simulcast to Long Island on WFTY's second digital subchannel (virtual channel 67.2, UHF channel 23.2) from its transmitter in Middle Island, New York.

History
The station first signed on the air on September 29, 1974 as WBTB-TV, an independent station founded by Old Bridge Township, New Jersey-based Blonder-Tongue Laboratories. The station's original call letters were intended to be WWRO-TV in its construction permit, but upon Blonder-Tongue's acquisition of the permit from Atlantic Video Corporation in 1972, the calls were changed; the first transmission was a test pattern with a drawing of a shade tree with the WBTB-TV calls. Channel 68 was the third commercial UHF station to sign-on in the northern New Jersey portion of the New York market, after WNJU-TV (channel 47) and future sister station WXTV. Blonder-Tongue's long-term plans for channel 68 was to offer an over-the-air subscription television service to the New York area, consisting of movies, sports and cultural programming. Due to financial issues, the station was forced to go dark on December 27, 1974.

Nine months later, on September 28, 1975, WBTB-TV returned to the air and became the first "specialty station" as defined by the Federal Communications Commission (FCC) with niche programming—featuring daily reports and updates from the New York financial exchanges. When the stock markets were closed, channel 68 offered shows such as the Grand Ole Opry during the late afternoon hours, a locally-produced variety series called The Uncle Floyd Show hosted by Floyd Vivino, and Christian programming hosted by Keith Hauser at night. Saturdays featured various ethnic programs, as well as religious programming during the day on Sunday and on weekday mornings before the stock market opened.

In 1976 Wometco Enterprises, the founding and longtime owners of WTVJ in Miami, purchased the station originally with the intent of making it more of a general entertainment station, and changed the station's callsign to WTVG in 1977. WTVG acquired the rights to some programs such as Lassie, Mister Ed, Green Acres and Speed Racer. However, due to high program costs in the New York City market, and the presence of six existing commercial VHF stations—including then-independents WNEW-TV (channel 5, now WNYW), WOR-TV (channel 9, now WWOR-TV), and WPIX (channel 11)—WTVG was at too much of a disadvantage to grow into a major player.

In the fall of 1977, Wometco launched a national over-the-air subscription television service called Wometco Home Theater, and opted to use WTVG as its flagship station. On July 16, 1979, the station's calls were changed to WWHT to match the program service (the WTVG call letters are now used by the ABC affiliate and one-time network O&O in Toledo, Ohio). Viewers who subscribed to WHT were given set-top converter boxes which descrambled the channel 68 signal. In a twist of irony, the converter boxes were manufactured by Blonder-Tongue Laboratories, thus fulfilling their original ambitions for the station they launched only three years earlier.

By 1980, WWHT's program lineup consisted of a mixture of religious shows (such as The PTL Club) during mornings and middays and general entertainment programs (including a one-hour business news show) in late afternoon and early evenings. WHT programming aired during late mornings, primetime and late nights. On weekends, the station ran children's, religious and ethnic brokered programs, with the subscription service beginning in late afternoons. Around this same time, Wometco purchased Smithtown-based WSNL-TV (channel 67, now WFTY-DT), which began simulcasting WWHT.

In the spring of 1981, WWHT dropped afternoon programming and began running Financial News Network from 9 to 10 a.m. and from 1 to 5 p.m. In the spring of 1983, WHT began offering programming 24 hours a day. By this time, WWHT only ran some religious programming from 7 to 10 a.m. weekdays and Sundays, and WHT programming the rest of the time. FNN, brokered shows and the few entertainment shows it had were dropped, with the Uncle Floyd Show moving to the New Jersey Network. In 1984, a year after Wometco's founder Mitchell Wolfson died, WWHT/WSNL and the other Wometco stations were sold to investment firm Kohlberg Kravis Roberts, which also bought the Storer Broadcasting group of stations.

By 1985 WHT folded, due to huge losses as a result of the expansion of cable television; as a result, the station switched to music videos as U68, programmed by Steve Leeds (later at MTV). U68's music video format was short-lived but had a much broader eclectic playlist than MTV and was highly regarded among recording artists of the era. Nevertheless, KKR was looking to sell all of its broadcast properties. The former Wometco stations were sold to separate buyers, with WTVJ eventually going to NBC Owned Television Stations. (The other Storer stations picked up by KKR went to Gillett Broadcasting). However, during Autumn 1986, WWHT and WSNL were sold to the Home Shopping Network becoming  WHSE and WHSI, respectively, and aired HSN programming full-time for the next sixteen years. When Barry Diller bought the USA Network (and effectively HSN), the company was renamed USA Broadcasting.

By the late 1990s, USA Broadcasting planned to switch its HSN stations to a general entertainment independent format, with WHSE/WHSI slated to switch in 2000 as WORX (which would have been branded as "The Worx 68"). Promos and station IDs were actually produced for the station, and classic series such as Taxi, I Love Lucy and Cheers were acquired for the station. Several of its sister stations had switched to the entertainment format in the prior two years. However, only weeks before the planned switch, USA put all its stations up for sale; The Walt Disney Company was originally the leading bidder for the stations, which would have made WHSE/WHSI a sister station to ABC owned-and-operated WABC-TV (channel 7), but Univision Communications outbid its competition in a close race. USA Broadcasting, as a result of the pending sale, scrapped the format switch, with WHSE remaining with HSN for a few more months as a result.

In the immediate aftermath of the September 11 attacks of 2001, the station temporarily broadcast WABC-TV.

In the fall of 2001, WHSE began carrying programming from AIN/UATV, two networks that generally affiliated with low-powered stations elsewhere in the country. Once Univision completed the purchase of the USA Broadcasting over a year after it was announced, the station became a charter affiliate of its new secondary network Telefutura (which would later relaunch as UniMás in January 2013) on January 14, 2002, and accordingly had its call letters changed to WFUT-TV.

Newscasts
From the mid-1970s through the early 1980s, channel 68 aired daily financial news and reports. By the late 1990s through early 2000s, an hour of financial news was added back to the schedule, as Bloomberg Information Television started to air in the early morning hours on weekdays.

In 2009, sister station WXTV began producing an hour-long extension of its weekday morning newscast (currently branded as Noticias 41 Al Despertar) for WFTY/WFUT, airing at 7:00a.m.

Technical information

Subchannels
The station's digital signal is multiplexed:

Analog-to-digital conversion
WFUT discontinued regular programming on its analog signal, over UHF channel 68, on June 12, 2009, as part of the federally mandated transition from analog to digital television. The station's digital signal relocated from its pre-transition UHF channel 58 to channel 30 (originally, its final digital channel assignment was to be UHF channel 41), using PSIP to display WFUT's virtual channel as 68 on digital television receivers, which (as with its original digital channel allocation) was among the high band UHF channels (52–69) that were removed from broadcasting use as a result of the transition.

See also
 All Channels Act
 WFTY-DT

References

External links
 Univision
 UniMás
  More information about Wometco Home Theater
 FCC History Cards for WFUT

FUT-DT
FUT-DT
Television channels and stations established in 1974
1974 establishments in New Jersey
UniMás network affiliates
GetTV affiliates
True Crime Network affiliates
Wometco Enterprises
FUT-DT
FUT-DT
Mass media in Newark, New Jersey
Companies based in Bergen County, New Jersey